Great Western Road may refer to:

 A road in Glasgow, Scotland, part of the A82 road trunk road
 A historical road in Shanghai, China, now part of Yan'an Road
 A historical road in New South Wales, Australia, now part of the Great Western Highway

See also
Great West Road (disambiguation)